Peter Crowther (born 4 July 1949) is a British journalist, short story writer, novelist, editor, publisher and anthologist. He is a founder (with Simon Conway) of PS Publishing. He edits a series of themed anthologies of science fiction short stories published by DAW books.  He is also the editor of Postscripts, an anthology established in 2004, which has since 2012 released the Exotic Gothic series, including Vol. 4 and 5.

Bibliography

Series

Forever Twilight
 Book One: Darkness, Darkness (2002)* 
 Book Two: Windows of the Soul (2009)*
* significantly expanded into Darkness Falling, The Forever Twilight (2011, Angry Robot) –

Standalone novels
 Escardy Gap (1996) (with James Lovegrove) – 
 After Happily Ever (2000) (with Gillian Roberts) (Cassette) – 
 By Wizard Oak (2011) –

Chapbook form
 Forest Plains (1996)
 Fugue on a G-String (1998)
 The Hand That Feeds (1999) (with James Lovegrove)
 Gandalph Cohen and the Land at the End of the Working Day (2000)
 All We Know of Heaven (2001) –

Collections of short stories
 The Longest Single Note and Other Strange Compositions (1999) – 
 Lonesome Roads (1999) – 
 Cold Comforts (2001) (CDRom)
 Songs of Leaving (2004)
 The Spaces Between the Lines (2007)
 The Land at the End of the Working Day (2008)
 Jewels in the Dust (2013)
 Things I Didn't Know My Father Knew (2021)

Short stories
 Blue Christmas (1991)		
 Constant Companion (1992)		
 The Visitor (1992)		
 Fallen Angel (1993)
 Rustle (1993)		
 Morning Terrors (1994)		
 All We Know of Heaven (1995)		
 Bindlestiff (1995)		
 A Breeze from a Distant Shore (1995)		
 Conundrums to Guess (1995)		
 Home Comforts (1995)		
 The Invasion (1995)		
 Too Short a Death (1995)		
 The Bachelor (1996)		
 The Fairy Trap (1996)		
 Halfway House (1996)		
 Surface Tension (1996)		
 A Worse Place than Hell (1996)	
 "Boxing Day" (1997)	
 The Killing of Davis-Davis (1997)		
 The Last Vampire (1997)		
 Palindromic (1997)		
 Safe Arrival (1997)		
 Three Plays a Quarter (1997)		
 Tomorrow Eyes (1997)		
 The Unbetrayable Reply (1997)		
 Elmer (1998)		
 Front-Page McGuffin and the Greatest Story Never Told (1998)
 "The Musician of Bremen, GA" (1998)		
 Some Burial Place, Vast and Dry (1998)		
 Cat On an Old School Roof (1999)		
 The Hand that Feeds (1999) (with James Lovegrove)		
 Late Night Pick-up (1999)		
 Old Delicious Burdens (1999)		
 Setting Free the Daughters of Earth (1999)		
 Shatsi (1999)
 "Circling the Drain" (2000)		
 Dream a Little Dream for Me... (2000)
 Songs of Leaving (2000)		
 Bernard Boyce Bennington And the American Dream (2001)
 "Things I Didn't Know My Father Knew" (2001)
 "Breathing in Faces" (2002)
 "Jewels in the Dust" (2004"
 "The Doorway in Stephenson's Store" (2005)
 "Thoughtful Breaths" (2006)

Anthologies edited by Crowther
 Narrow Houses (1992) – 
 Narrow Houses Vol 2: Touch Wood (1993) – 
 Narrow Houses Vol 3: Blue Motel (1994) – 
 Heaven Sent: 18 Glorious Tales of the Angels (1995) – 
 Tombs (1996) – 
 Dante's Disciples (1997) – 
 Destination Unknown (1997) – 
 Tales in Time (1997) – 
 Tales in Space (1998) – 
 Moon Shots (1999) – 
 Foursight (1999) – 
 Taps and Sighs (1999) – 
 Foursight Vol 2: Futures (2000) – 
 Mars Probes (2002) – 
 Foursight Vol 3: Infinities (2002) – 
 Foursight Vol. 4: Cities (2003) – 
 Foursight Vol. 5: Fourbodings (2005) – 
 Constellations (2005) – 
 Forbidden Planets (2006) – 
 We Think, Therefore We Are (2009) –

Literary awards

Major awards 
Crowther has won a variety of BFAs, primarily as editor. He's also a two-time winner of the World Fantasy Awards.

Other media
 In the television series Fear Itself, an episode of Season 1 ("Eater") is based on the short story of the same name. The same story had previously been adapted as an episode of the British horror anthology series Urban Gothic.

Cultural references
 Crowther has been mentioned in Alan Hollinghurst's 2005 novel The Line of Beauty, in the very first lines.

References

External links

Biography from the World Horror Convention
Peter Crowther at Scifipedia
PS Publishing

1949 births
Living people
English short story writers
English science fiction writers
English male journalists
Science fiction editors
English publishers (people)
English male short story writers
English male novelists
British speculative fiction editors
British speculative fiction publishers (people)